Antho is a genus of sponges belonging to the family Microcionidae. The genus has a cosmopolitan distribution and is known from virtually all parts of the global ocean. There are 62 species in five subgenera.

Species 
The following species are recognised:

Subgenus Antho (Acarnia) (Gray, 1867)

 Antho (Acarnia) arctica (Koltun, 1959)
 Antho (Acarnia) bakusi (Sim & Lee, 1998)
 Antho (Acarnia) circonflexa (Lévi, 1960)
 Antho (Acarnia) coriacea (Bowerbank, 1874)
 Antho (Acarnia) elegans (Ridley & Dendy, 1887)
 Antho (Acarnia) frondifera (Lamarck, 1814)
 Antho (Acarnia) illgi (Bakus, 1966)
 Antho (Acarnia) inconspicua (Desqueyroux, 1972)
 Antho (Acarnia) kellyae (Samaai & Gibbons, 2005)
 Antho (Acarnia) levii (Bergquist & Fromont, 1988)
 Antho (Acarnia) pellita (Van Soest, Meesters & Becking, 2014)
 Antho (Acarnia) penneyi (Laubenfels, 1936)
 Antho (Acarnia) planoramosa (Koltun, 1962)
 Antho (Acarnia) prima (Brøndsted, 1924)
 Antho (Acarnia) ridgwayi (Stone, Lehnert & Hoff, 2019)
 Antho (Acarnia) ridleyi (Hentschel, 1912)
 Antho (Acarnia) signata (Topsent, 1904)
 Antho (Acarnia) simplicissima (Burton, 1932)
 Antho (Acarnia) spinulosa (Tanita, 1968)

Subgenus Antho (Antho) (Gray, 1867)

 Antho (Antho) arcitenens (Topsent, 1892)
 Antho (Antho) atlantidae (Van Soest, Beglinger & De Voogd, 2013)
 Antho (Antho) barbadensis (van Soest, 1984)
 Antho (Antho) brondstedi (Bergquist & Fromont, 1988)
 Antho (Antho) burtoni (Lévi, 1952)
 Antho (Antho) dichotoma (Linnaeus, 1767)
 Antho (Antho) graceae (Bakus, 1966)
 Antho (Antho) granditoxa (Picton & Goodwin, 2007)
 Antho (Antho) heterospiculata (Brøndsted, 1924)
 Antho (Antho) inconstans (Topsent, 1925)
 Antho (Antho) involvens (Schmidt, 1864)
 Antho (Antho) mediterranea (Babiç, 1922)
 Antho (Antho) morisca (Schmidt, 1868)
 Antho (Antho) nuda (Van Soest, Beglinger & De Voogd, 2013)
 Antho (Antho) opuntioides (Lamarck, 1815)
 Antho (Antho) oxeifera (Ferrer-Hernandez, 1921)
 Antho (Antho) paradoxa (Babiç, 1922)
 Antho (Antho) paucispina (Sarà & Siribelli, 1962)
 Antho (Antho) tuberosa (Hentschel, 1911)

Subgenus Antho (Isopenectya) (Hallmann, 1920)

 Antho (Isopenectya) chartacea (Whitelegge, 1907)
 Antho (Isopenectya) primitiva (Burton, 1935)
 Antho (Isopenectya) punicea (Hooper, 1996)
 Antho (Isopenectya) saintvincenti (Hooper, 1996)

Subgenus Antho (Jia) (Laubenfels, 1930)

 Antho (Jia) brattegardi (van Soest & Stone, 1986)
 Antho (Jia) galapagosensis (Van Soest, Rützler & Sim, 2016)
 Antho (Jia) jia (Laubenfels, 1930)
 Antho (Jia) lithisticola (Van Soest, Rützler & Sim, 2016)
 Antho (Jia) lithophoenix (de Laubenfels, 1927)
 Antho (Jia) ramosa (Van Soest, Rützler & Sim, 2016)
 Antho (Jia) wunschorum (Van Soest, Rützler & Sim, 2016)

Subgenus Antho (Plocamia) (Schmidt, 1870)

 Antho (Plocamia) anisotyla (Lévi, 1960)
 Antho (Plocamia) arbuscula (Burton, 1959)
 Antho (Plocamia) bremecae (Schejter, Bertolino & Calcinai, 2017)
 Antho (Plocamia) erecta (Ferrer Hernández, 1923)
 Antho (Plocamia) gymnazusa (Schmidt, 1870)
 Antho (Plocamia) hallezi (Topsent, 1904)
 Antho (Plocamia) karykina (de Laubenfels, 1927)
 Antho (Plocamia) karyoka (Dickinson, 1945)
 Antho (Plocamia) lambei (Burton, 1935)
 Antho (Plocamia) manaarensis (Carter, 1880)
 Antho (Plocamia) novizelanica (Ridley & Duncan, 1881)
 Antho (Plocamia) sarasiri (Costa, Pansini & Bertolino, 2019)

References

Poecilosclerida
Sponge genera